The Princedom Cabin is a historic cabin on the south side of Lookout Drive in Bella Vista, Arkansas.  It is a wood-frame structure with one story facing the road, and two at the back of its steeply sloping lot.  It is finished in board-and-batten siding, and has a low pitch roof, with a fieldstone chimney prominently placed at the front facade.  Built c. 1923, this typical cabin of the period has been modified by enclosing its car port as a sleeping porch and building an open deck between it and the main cabin.  It is one of a small number of surviving little-altered 1920s cabins built in the area.

The cabin was listed on the National Register of Historic Places in 1988.

See also
National Register of Historic Places listings in Benton County, Arkansas

References

Houses on the National Register of Historic Places in Arkansas
Houses completed in 1923
Houses in Benton County, Arkansas
National Register of Historic Places in Benton County, Arkansas
Buildings and structures in Bella Vista, Arkansas
1923 establishments in Arkansas